Kim Sung-su (born November 15, 1961) is a South Korean film director, known mainly for the teen film Beat, period epic Musa and the comedy Please Teach Me English.

Filmography 
 Black Republic (1990) - screenplay
 Berlin Report (1991) - assistant director, script editor
 Fly High Run Far (1991) - crew
 Blue in You (1992) - script editor
 Dead End (short film, 1993) - director, screenplay
 Out to the World (1994) - script editor
 Runaway (1995) - director, screenplay
 Sunset into the Neon Lights (1995) - script editor
 Beat (1997) - director, cameo
 City of the Rising Sun (1998) - director, screenplay
 Musa (2001) - director, screenplay
 Please Teach Me English (2003) - director, screenplay, producer
 Back (short film, 2004) - director, screenplay, editor
 The Restless (2006) - producer
 My Ex-Wife's Wedding (2010) - producer
 The Flu (2013) - director
 Asura: The City of Madness (2016) - director, screenplay

External links 
 
 
 Kim Sung-soo at Korean Film Biz Zone

1961 births
Living people
South Korean film directors